Hard Times (2020) (stylized as  Hard × Times) was the first Hard Times professional wrestling pay-per-view (PPV) event promoted by the National Wrestling Alliance (NWA). It took place on January 24, 2020, in Atlanta, Georgia, at the GPB Studios. The show featured a tournament to crown a new NWA World Television Champion, which was won by Ricky Starks. The event also featured wrestlers from Ring of Honor, including Dan Maff, and Villain Enterprises members Marty Scurll and Flip Gordon.

Production

Background
During the December 15, 2019 Into the Fire pay-per-view (PPV), the National Wrestling Alliance (NWA) announced that their next PPV would be held on January 24, 2020 and be called "Hard Times". At the same time the NWA announced they were reintroducing the NWA World Television Championship with a new champion being crowned at the PPV on FITE TV.

Storylines
Hard Times featured ten professional wrestling matches, with different wrestlers who were involved in pre-existing scripted feuds, plots and storylines. Wrestlers portrayed heels or faces as they engaged in a series of tension-building events, which culminated in a wrestling match. The second season of NWA's weekly flagship program, Power, featured storylines leading up to the pay-per-view.

On the December 17, 2019 episode of the NWA's weekly show, Power, it was revealed that all World Television Championship tournament matches would have a 6 minute, 5 second time limit. The time limit was an homage to the 6:05 PM start time of NWA Power as well as a tribute to the original start time for NWA's World Championship Wrestling that ran from the 1970s to 1992. Announced participants included: Ricky Starks, Eddie Kingston, The Question Mark, Colt Cabana, Tim Storm, Nick Aldis, Zicky Dice, Caleb Konley, Dave Dawson, Zane Dawson, Trevor Murdoch, and Thom Latimer. The first two tournament matches announced were Starks vs. Kingston and The Question Mark vs. Cabana. Starks defeated Kingston via pinfall in 4:10, and The Question Mark defeated Cabana via pinfall in 3:05 with both matches airing on the December 23 episode of Power. On the January 1, 2020 episode of Power, Aldis refused to enter his tournament match against Tim Storm and ordered fellow Strictly Business member Royce Isaacs to take his place. Storm defeated Isaacs via pinfall in 4:26. On the January 7 episode of Power, Tim Storm clarified that these were qualifying matches and that six competitors would move on to the first round of the NWA World Television Championship tournament. He also announced there would be two additional spots open in the first round for competitors not currently on the NWA roster. Zicky Dice defeated Caleb Konley via pinfall in 4:43 later in the show. The tournament bracket was unveiled on the January 14 episode of Power. Zane Dawson def. Dave Dawson via pinfall in 3:56 later in the same episode. On the January 21 episode of Power, Trevor Murdoch defeated Thom Latimer via pinfall in 3:30. Zane Dawson dropped out of the tournament due to a hand injury, and an 8-man Last Chance Gauntlet match was held to determine the new competitor to fill the spot. The eight competitors were C. W. Anderson, Caleb Konley, Josephus, Colt Cabana, Dave Dawson, Aron Stevens, Sal Rinauro, and Ken Anderson. Anderson won when he pinned Cabana, his last remaining opponent. Anderson attacked Cabana after the match. Later in the same episode, the final two competitors in the first round of the tournament were named: Matt Cross from the independent circuit and Dan Maff from Ring of Honor.

At Into the Fire, NWA Worlds Champion Nick Aldis was confronted by Marty Scurll after his title defense. In response, Aldis and the Strictly Business stable attacked Scurll and his Villain Enterprises teammates at Ring of Honor's (ROH) Saturday Night at Center Stage and Honor Reigns Supreme events. On January 14, the NWA announced that Aldis would face Villain Enterprises' Flip Gordon in an interpromotional match at Hard Times.

Results

NWA World Television Championship Tournament

See also
2020 in professional wrestling

References

External links

National Wrestling Alliance pay-per-view events
2020 in professional wrestling
2020 in Georgia (U.S. state)
Events in Atlanta
Professional wrestling in Atlanta
January 2020 events in the United States
NWA Hard Times